Fairview Cemetery is a historic cemetery in the Hyde Park neighborhood of Boston, Massachusetts. A small section of the cemetery is located in neighboring Dedham.  The cemetery was established by the town of Hyde Park in 1892, and became the responsibility of the city of Boston when it annexed that town in 1912.  The cemetery was added to the National Register of Historic Places on September 16, 2009.  It is the newest of Boston's cemeteries, and has more than 40,000 burials. It is the location where the City of Boston “bury indigent and unclaimed people”.

Description
Fairview Cemetery is located on the west side of Hyde Park, bounded on the east by houses lining Turtle Pond Parkway, and the south by Boston's Mill Pond Reservation.  The main entrance is near its southeast corner, accessed via Fairview Avenue from the junction of Turtle Pond Parkway and River Street.  The core of the cemetery is dominated by a hill which provides views of the surrounding countryside, and is a significant influence on the circulation pattern.  Early burials tended to be placed on the higher levels of the hill, and included large family lots with family monuments.

The town of Hyde Park was incorporated in 1868, and in 1892 authorized the purchase of the estate of William S. Damrell, a businessman and Congressman.  The core of the cemetery (about 50 of its nearly ) was laid out in the then-fashionable rural cemetery style, with winding lanes and a landscaped environment, by G.L. Richardson.  It was the Hyde Park's first cemetery, and the last public cemetery established in what is now the city of Boston.  Between its founding and 1965, it was gradually increased in size to reach its present dimensions.

Notable interments
 Henry Beebee Carrington, brigadier general
 Rebecca Davis Lee Crumpler, MD., first African American female physician
 Thomas Menino, Mayor of Boston
 William Monroe Trotter (1872–1934), newspaper editor and African-American civil rights activist

The cemetery contains one British Commonwealth war grave, of a Royal Naval Reserve seaman of World War I.

Gallery

See also
 National Register of Historic Places listings in southern Boston, Massachusetts
 National Register of Historic Places listings in Norfolk County, Massachusetts

References

External links
 

Cemeteries on the National Register of Historic Places in Massachusetts
Cemeteries in Hyde Park, Boston
National Register of Historic Places in Boston
Hyde Park, Boston
Buildings and structures in Dedham, Massachusetts
Cemeteries in Norfolk County, Massachusetts
National Register of Historic Places in Norfolk County, Massachusetts
Rural cemeteries
Commonwealth War Graves Commission cemeteries in the United States
Cemeteries established in the 1890s